Sony Imagesoft Inc. was an American video game publisher that operated from 1989 to 1995 and was located in California. It was established in January 1989  in Los Angeles, California, as a subsidiary of the Japan-based CBS/Sony Group (CSG) and initially named CSG Imagesoft Inc. Their focus at the beginning was on marketing games exclusively for Nintendo consoles.

The first release was Super Dodge Ball in summer 1989. Games by UK-based developers, Solstice and Dragon's Lair, followed in 1990. Both were also published in Japan through Epic/Sony Records.

After Sony had set up its North American division, Sony Electronic Publishing in April 1991, Imagesoft operated as Sony Imagesoft Inc.

Other releases are localizations of SNES games previously developed for Sony Music Entertainment (Japan) and published under the Epic/Sony Records brand: Extra Innings and Smart Ball, both published in 1992. Following a shakeup at Sony in 1995, Sony Imagesoft was merged into Sony Computer Entertainment of America (SCEA) and has since only supported the PlayStation brand.

Sega partnership 
On May 20, 1992, Sega of America and Sony Electronic Publishing announced a partnership to create content for Sega's consoles under the direction of Imagesoft. Besides Sega's cartridge-based Genesis and Game Gear consoles the partnership targeted the upcoming Sega CD peripheral. Among the first titles released for Sega's consoles after the announcement are Sewer Shark and Hook. Sewer Shark, initially released exclusively to Sega CD, is a rail-shooter that years earlier had been shelved as part of the ill-fated Control-Vision platform. The Hook video games are tie-ins to the Spielberg feature film Hook that premiered in December 1991 and was produced by Sony-owned TriStar Pictures. Ports of the video game for Sega platforms are based on the SNES game published earlier by Imagesoft. The Sega CD version was enhanced with better cut scenes with voice actors and digital stills and featured music from the film soundtrack.

1995 changes 
In March 1995 Sony Imagesoft announced that it had appointed Kelly Flock as president. Flock came from TriMark Interactive where he was executive vice president since March 1993.

Starting in July 1995, just two months prior to the release of the PlayStation console in Western markets, Sony Electronic Publishing restructured and renamed its divisions. All video game marketing from Sony Imagesoft was folded into Sony Computer Entertainment of America (SCEA), with about 100 employees transferred from Santa Monica to Foster City. The video game business of Sony Imagesoft was merged with the product development branch of SCEA and became Sony Interactive Studios America which would later be renamed to 989 Studios.

The computer software business of Imagesoft became Sony Interactive PC Software America and was headed by general manager Ray Sangster.

Games published

Games developed

References

External links 
 Sony Imagesoft profile on MobyGames

Imagesoft
Defunct video game companies of the United States
Entertainment companies based in California
Video game companies established in 1989
Video game companies disestablished in 1995
Video game publishers
1989 establishments in California
1995 disestablishments in California